Pierre Rabot (born 1865, date of death unknown) was a French sailor. He won the Bronze medal in the  6m class in the 1908 Summer Olympics in London along with Louis Potheau and Henri Arthus.

References

French male sailors (sport)
Sailors at the 1908 Summer Olympics – 6 Metre
Olympic sailors of France
Olympic bronze medalists for France
Olympic medalists in sailing
19th-century births
Year of death missing
Medalists at the 1908 Summer Olympics